Burning Desire is a posthumous Jimi Hendrix compilation album. 

Burning Desire may also refer to:

Music
"Burning Desire" (song), a song by Lana Del Rey 
"Burning Desire", a song by Jimi Hendrix from The Baggy's Rehearsal Sessions

Other
Burning desire, an exhibit by artist Maurice Bennett 1998  
Burning Desires, a play by Joan Schenkar at the Defiant Theatre
Burning Desire, a video game released by Playaround